Square of Europe (romanised: ploshchad' Yevropy)  is a square in Moscow. It is located outside the Garden Ring, just off Bolshaya Dorogomilovskaya Street, and borders on Kievsky Rail Terminal, the Radisson Slavyanskaya Hotel, and Berezhkovskaya Embankment overlooking the Moskva River.

The square used to be part of Kiyevsky Rail Terminal Square and received its present name in 2002 after it was redeveloped and enhanced with an animated fountain The Abduction of Europa designed by Belgian sculptor Olivier Strebelle. Another major landmark is the pedestrian Bogdan Khmelnitsky Bridge across the Moskva River, built in 2001. The bridge links the southern corner of the square to Khamovniki District.

As of March 18, 2023, the European flags have been removed. (Citation: https://twitter.com/officejjsmart/status/1637198331364491264 )

Photo gallery

Squares in Moscow